Glengarry Glen Ross is a play by David Mamet that won the Pulitzer Prize in 1984. The play shows parts of two days in the lives of four desperate Chicago real estate agents who are prepared to engage in any number of unethical, illegal acts—from lies and flattery to bribery, threats, intimidation and burglary—to sell real estate to unwitting prospective buyers. It is based on Mamet's experience having previously worked in a similar office.

The title comes from two real estate developments mentioned in the play.  Glengarry Highlands is the prime real estate everyone is attempting to sell now; Glen Ross Farms is mentioned by several characters as having been very lucrative for those selling it several years ago.

The world premiere was at the National Theatre in London on 21 September 1983, where Bill Bryden's production in the Cottesloe Theatre was acclaimed as a triumph of ensemble acting.

The play opened on Broadway on 25 March 1984, at the John Golden Theatre, and closed on 17 February 1985 after 378 performances. The production was directed by Gregory Mosher, and starred Joe Mantegna, Mike Nussbaum, Robert Prosky, Lane Smith, James Tolkan, Jack Wallace and J. T. Walsh. It  was nominated for four Tony awards including Best Play, Best Director, and two Best Featured Actor nominations for Robert Prosky and Joe Mantegna, who won the production's one Tony.

Characters
 Richard "Ricky" Roma: The most successful salesman in the office. Although Roma seems to think of himself as a latter-day cowboy and regards his ability to make a sale as a sign of his virility, he admits only to himself that it is all luck. He is ruthless, dishonest and immoral, and succeeds because he has a talent for figuring out a client's weaknesses and crafting a pitch that will exploit those weaknesses. He is a smooth talker and often speaks in grand, poetic soliloquies.
 Shelley "The Machine" Levene: An older, once-successful salesman, who has fallen on hard times and has not closed a big deal in a long time. In Mamet's original 1983 stage version, Levene reveals his daughter's plight as a final ploy to gain Williamson's sympathy to get better leads, although this fails. However, in the 1992 film version, Levene's discussion of his daughter also includes comments and a phone call to her doctor about her poor health, making Levene more sympathetic.
 James Lingk: A timid, middle-aged man who becomes Roma's latest client. Lingk is easily manipulated and finds Roma highly charismatic. Upon consulting his wife, he becomes desperate to regain the money that Roma has closed on him.
 John Williamson: The office manager. The salesmen need him because he hands out the sales leads but Williamson does not like how they treat him, especially Levene, who berates him for the unpromising leads Levene always seems to get.
 George Aaronow: An aging salesman with low self-esteem who, lacking hope and confidence, is not without conscience. His frustration begins to boil up when the office is robbed, and he worries about being convicted based upon Detective Baylen's interrogation. Ironically, he and Roma end up the remaining two salesmen for the firm after Shelley is found out, and gives up Moss as Levene's co-conspirator.
 Dave Moss: A big-mouthed salesman with big dreams and schemes. Moss resents Williamson and agency owners Mitch and Murray for putting such pressure on him and plans to strike back at them by stealing all their best sales leads and selling them to a competitor. Moss sees Aaronow as a potential accomplice, but eventually convinces Levene to work with him in selling the leads to Jerry Graff, a local competitor. During his final rant against Roma, his indignation reveals that his jealousy extends towards even his fellow salesmen, and he decides to go to Wisconsin to avoid further questioning.
 Baylen: A police detective. He appears in the final act to investigate the office break-in and harshly interrogate each cast member behind closed doors.
 Mitch and Murray: The unsavory unseen characters are the owners of the real estate agency. They have a sales "contest", which puts enormous pressure on the salesmen to produce or to lose their jobs, in which only the top two will come out with prizes; the rest will be fired.

Synopsis

Act I
Setting: a Chinese restaurant

Scene 1: Shelly Levene tries to convince office manager John Williamson to give him some of "the Glengarry leads" (names and phone numbers of promising potential clients for expensive properties). Williamson is willing to sell some of the prime leads, but demands cash in advance. Levene cannot come up with the cash and must leave without any good leads to work with.

Scene 2: Dave Moss and George Aaronow hate the pressure management has put on them to succeed. Moss tells Aaronow that they need to strike back by stealing all the Glengarry leads and selling them to another real estate agency. Moss's plan would require Aaronow to break into the office, stage a burglary, and steal all the prime leads. Aaronow wants no part of the plan, but Moss intimidates him, claiming that he is already an accomplice simply by listening to Moss's pitch.

Scene 3: Ricky Roma delivers a monologue to James Lingk. Roma does not bring up the real estate he wants to sell to Lingk until the very end. Instead, Roma preys upon Lingk's insecurities, and his sense that he has never done anything adventurous with his life.

Act II
Setting: a real estate sales office

The burglary is discovered. Williamson has summoned a police detective. Shelley Levene is happy, because he has finally sold a large plot of land to a couple named Nyborg. James Lingk enters the office, looking for Ricky Roma. Lingk's wife has ordered him to cancel the sales
contract he signed with Roma. Roma attempts to smooth-talk Lingk into not canceling the contract, informing Lingk that his check has not yet been brought to the bank; this begins to have its intended calming effect on Lingk, who is clearly agitated. Levene supports the ruse, but Williamson, thinking Lingk is worried about the safety of his check, accidentally ruins Roma's ploy when he tells Lingk that his check has just been deposited.  Lingk abruptly leaves, telling Roma he's sorry for letting him down.

Roma is furious at Williamson, who has blown a big sale. Levene picks up where Roma left off, and begins insulting Williamson. Mid-rant, Levene accidentally reveals his knowledge that Williamson made up the claim about the check being cashed, information he could not have known unless he had been in Williamson's office. Williamson accuses Levene of robbing the office. Levene quickly folds and admits that he and Dave Moss were the thieves. Levene tries to bribe Williamson, offering half of his future sales. Williamson reveals that the Nyborg sale is worthless, as the couple is elderly, mentally ill and just like talking to salesmen because they're so lonely. Levene asks why Williamson wants him turned in, and why he wouldn't give him the leads in the first place. Williamson simply states he doesn't like Levene, for the years of verbal abuse, and the old man's flippant nature.  Roma comes back from his interrogation and Williamson goes in the back room to speak with the detective. Alone with a devastated Levene, Roma proposes the two men work together. The door opens and the detective demands to speak with Levene, shoving him into the back room.

Roma, unaware of Levene's fate, reveals his true intentions behind the partnership. Roma orders Williamson to not only continue to hand him the best leads, but to add half of Levene's commissions. Williamson tells Roma not to worry about it but Roma won't listen. Aaronow enters the office, desperate to know if they found the perpetrators. Roma says no and heads out to the restaurant.

Controversy
There was controversy over lines in the play, and in the film adaptation of it, in which it was claimed prejudice was shown against Indian-Americans. As a result, Mamet removed the language from a 2004 San Francisco revival. The controversial dialogue is included in the film version about a potential lead from the "Patels", an Indian family name.

Productions
The world premiere of Glengarry Glen Ross was at the Cottesloe Theatre of the Royal National Theatre in London on 21 September 1983, directed by Bill Bryden.

Original 1983 London cast
 Derek Newark – Shelley Levene
 Karl Johnson – John Williamson
 Trevor Ray – Dave Moss
 James Grant – George Aaronow
 Jack Shepherd – Richard Roma
 Tony Haygarth – James Lingk
 John Tams – Baylen

Glengarry Glen Ross had its U.S. premiere on 6 February 1984, at the Goodman Theatre of the Art Institute of Chicago before moving to Broadway on 25 March 1984 at the John Golden Theatre and running for 378 shows.

Subsequent 1984 Chicago and Broadway cast
 Robert Prosky – Shelley Levene
 J. T. Walsh – John Williamson
 James Tolkan – Dave Moss
 Mike Nussbaum – George Aaronow
 Joe Mantegna – Richard Roma
 William L. Petersen – James Lingk (Chicago)
 Lane Smith – James Lingk (Broadway)
 Jack Wallace – Baylen

On February 18, 2000, the first major regional revival opened at the McCarter Theater in Princeton, New Jersey, starring Charles Durning as Levene and Ruben Santiago-Hudson a Roma.

On 1 May 2005, a Broadway revival directed by Joe Mantello opened at the Bernard B. Jacobs Theatre. The revival starred Liev Schreiber as Roma, Alan Alda as Levene, Frederick Weller as Williamson, Gordon Clapp as Moss, Jeffrey Tambor as Aaronow, Tom Wopat as Lingk and Jordan Lage as Baylen. The revival received numerous Tony Award nominations, including Best Featured Actor nominations for Schreiber, Clapp and Alda, with Schreiber taking home the prize. The production also won the Tony Award for Best Revival of a Play.

On 27 September 2007, the play was revived at the Apollo Theatre, London, starring Jonathan Pryce (who played client James Lingk in the 1992 film adaptation) as Levene, alongside Aidan Gillen (Roma), Paul Freeman (Aaronow), Matthew Marsh (Moss) and Peter McDonald (Williamson). The production was directed by James Macdonald.

Glengarry Glen Ross has also been produced as a radio play for BBC Radio 3, featuring Héctor Elizondo, Stacy Keach, Bruce Davison, and Alfred Molina as Roma, first airing 20 March 2005.

A second Broadway revival, directed by Daniel Sullivan opened on 8 December 2012 at the Gerald Schoenfeld Theatre. The production starred Al Pacino (who had played Roma in the 1992 film) as Levene, Bobby Cannavale as Roma, David Harbour as Williamson, John C. McGinley as Moss, Jeremy Shamos as Lingk, Richard Schiff as Aaronow and Murphy Guyer as Baylen. This version received mixed reviews, with Pacino's portrayal of Levene being criticized.

On 26 October 2017, a revival in London's West End directed by Sam Yates opened at the Playhouse Theatre, running for 14 weeks. The production starred Christian Slater as Roma, Robert Glenister as Moss, Kris Marshall as Blake, Stanley Townsend as Levene, Don Warrington as Aaronow, Oliver Ryan as Baylen and Daniel Ryan as Lingk. From February 2019 the production will tour the UK starring Mark Benton as Levene and Nigel Harman as Roma, with further casting to be announced.

The character played in the film version by Alec Baldwin was written specifically for the movie and does not appear in the playscript. At least some amateur revivals of the play have added the scene back in; one placed it at the start with Blake directly addressing the audience. (Baldwin's character simply gives his name as "Fuck You" in the film, although credits refer to him as "Blake".)

Film adaptation

The 1992 film adaptation directed by James Foley was released using an expanded script featuring a role specifically written for Alec Baldwin.
 Jack Lemmon as Shelley Levene
 Kevin Spacey as John Williamson
 Ed Harris as Dave Moss
 Alan Arkin as George Aaronow
 Al Pacino as Richard Roma
 Jonathan Pryce as James Lingk
 Jude Ciccolella as Baylen
 Alec Baldwin as Blake

Awards and nominations

Original Broadway production

2005 Broadway revival

References

External links

 
 
 Original play script

1983 plays
Broadway plays
Plays by David Mamet
Drama Desk Award-winning plays
Laurence Olivier Award-winning plays
Plays set in Chicago
Pulitzer Prize for Drama-winning works
Tony Award-winning plays
American plays adapted into films

es:Glengarry Glen Ross